Ambiguity tolerance–intolerance is a psychological construct that describes the relationship that individuals have with ambiguous stimuli or events. Individuals view these stimuli in a neutral and open way or as a threat.

History
Ambiguity tolerance–intolerance is a construct that was first introduced in 1949 through the work of Else Frenkel-Brunswik while researching ethnocentrism in children and was perpetuated by her research of ambiguity intolerance in connection to authoritarian personality. It serves to define and measure how well an individual responds when presented with an event that results in ambiguous stimuli or situations. In her study, she tested the notion that children who are ethnically prejudiced also tend to reject ambiguity more so than their peers. She studied children who ranked high and low on prejudice in a story recall test and then studied their responses to an ambiguous disc shaped figure. The children who scored high in prejudice were expected to take longer to give a response to the shape, less likely to make changes on their response, and less likely to change their perspectives. 
A study by Kenny and Ginsberg (1958) retesting Frenkel-Brunswik's original connection of ambiguity intolerance to ethnocentrism and authoritarian personality found that the results were unreplicable. However, it was discussed that this may be due to the fact that at the time the study was done incorrect methodology was used and that there lacked a concrete definition as to what the construct was. Most of the research on this subject was completed in the two decades after the publication of The Authoritarian Personality, however the construct is still studied in psychological research today. 
Budner gives three examples as to what could be considered ambiguous situations: a situation with no familiar cues, a situation in which there are many cues to be taken into consideration, and a situation in which cues suggest the existence of different structures to be adhered to.

Conceptualization 
There have been many attempts to conceptualize the construct of ambiguity tolerance–intolerance as to give researchers a more standard concept to work with. Many of these conceptualizations are based on the work of Frenkel-Brunswik.
 
Budner (1962) defines the construct as the following:
Intolerance of ambiguity may be defined as 'the tendency to perceive (i.e. interpret) ambiguous situations as sources of threat'; tolerance of ambiguity as 'the tendency to perceive ambiguous situations as desirable.'
Additionally Bochner (1965) categorized attributes given by Frenkel-Brunswik's theory of individuals who are intolerant to ambiguity. 
The nine primary characteristics describe intolerance of ambiguity and are as follows: 
Need for categorization
Need for certainty
Inability to allow good and bad traits to exist in the same person
Acceptance of attitude statements representing a white-black view of life
A preference for familiar over unfamiliar
Rejection of the unusual or different
Resistance to reversal of fluctuating stimuli
Early selection and maintenance of one solution in an ambiguous situation
Premature closure
The secondary characteristics describe individuals who are intolerant to ambiguity as:
authoritarian
dogmatic
rigid
closed minded
ethnically prejudiced
uncreative
anxious
extra-punitive
aggressive

Operationalization and measurement
Because of the lack of concrete conceptualization of what ambiguity intolerance is, there are a variety of ways in which to measure the construct. For example, Stanley Budner developed a scale with 16 items designed to measure how subjects would respond to an ambiguous situation.

Block and Block (1951) operationalized the construct by measuring the amount of time required to structure an ambiguous situation. The less amount of time required to structure, the higher a person would score in ambiguity intolerance.

Levitt (1953) studied intolerance of ambiguity in children and asserted that the Decision Location Test and Misconception Scale both served as accurate measures of ambiguity intolerance.

Psychological implications
The construct of ambiguity intolerance is found in different aspects of psychology and mental health. The construct is used in many branches of psychology including personality, developmental, and social psychology. Some examples of how tolerance–intolerance of ambiguity is used within various branches are displayed below.

Personality psychology
The construct of ambiguity intolerance was conceptualized in the study of personality. While the original theory of ambiguity intolerance being positively correlated to authoritarian personalities has come under fire, the construct is still used in this branch. A study was done testing college students' tolerance for ambiguity and found that students who were involved in the arts had higher scores than business students on ambiguity tolerance, from which the assertion that creativity is linked to the construct.

Developmental psychology
Harington, Block, and Block (1978) assessed intolerance of ambiguity in children at an early age, ranging from 3.5 to 4.5 years. The children were assessed using two tests performed by caretakers in a daycare center. The researchers then re-evaluated the children when they turned seven, and their data showed that male students who were high in ambiguity intolerance at the early age had more anxiety, required more structure, and had less effective cognitive structure than their female peers who had also tested high in ambiguity intolerance.

Social psychology
Being intolerant to ambiguity can affect how an individual perceives others with whom they come into contact. Social psychology uses ambiguity tolerance–intolerance to study these relationships and the relationship one holds with themselves. Research has been conducted on how ambiguity tolerance–intolerance interacts with racial identity, homophobia, marital satisfaction, and pregnancy adjustment.

Mental health
Research shows that being too far on either end of the spectrum of ambiguity tolerance–intolerance can be detrimental to mental health. 
Ambiguity intolerance is thought to serve as a cognitive vulnerability that can lead, in conjunction with stressful life events and negative rumination, to depression. Anderson and Schwartz hypothesize that this is because ambiguity intolerant individuals tend to see the world as concrete and unchanging, and when an event occurs which disrupts this view these individuals struggle with the ambiguity of their future. Therefore, those who are intolerant to ambiguity begin to have negative cognitions about their respective situation, and soon view these cognitions as a certainty. This certainty can serve as a predictive measure of depression.

References

Human communication
Pedagogy
Ambiguity